The Keystone Generating Station is a 1.71-gigawatt (1,711 MW), coal power plant located on roughly  in Plumcreek Township, southeastern Armstrong County, Pennsylvania near Crooked Creek, just west of Shelocta, Pennsylvania.

The plant was built in 1967, and expanded in 1968. It has had a number of improvements made over the years to reduce the level of environmental pollution, especially measures to cut down acidic emissions of nitrogen and sulphur oxides.

The power plant will close by or before December 31, 2028, as a result of a new wastewater rule that prohibits coal power plants from dumping mercury, arsenic, and selenium into streams and rivers, along with at the Conemaugh Generating Station and at least 24 other power plants in 14 states.

Technical specifications
 
The facility consists of two steam turbines, which began commercial operation in 1967 and 1968, and four cooling towers.
  
The main turbines run on steam produced by twin 850 MW boilers, each as tall as a 14-story building. The plant uses in excess of four million tons of coal a year. The plant ranks among the best in the US in terms of availability among coal plants of the same size.

Each unit is a Westinghouse cross-compound dual steam turbine-generator operating at supercritical steam conditions.  At the time Keystone was constructed, Units 1 and 2 were the largest generating units in the world.  Keystone was the first plant to be constructed away from a significant source of cooling water.  The Keystone Reservoir was constructed on the North Branch of Plum Creek, a tributary of Crooked Creek to provide a constant source of cooling water for the plant's thermodynamic cycle year round.  The cooling tower system at Keystone marks one of the most significant of early environmental controls on large power plants in the United States (thermal pollution of waterways was one of the first types of pollution to experience significant controls).

The plant's steam generators each produce approximately seven million lbs. of steam per hour at 3,800 psi and 1,005 deg. F., with a single reheat to the same temperature. Each unit has two boiler feed pumps, one of which is run by its own steam turbine, and the other of which is powered via the low-pressure turbine-generator through a fluid coupling (so rpm may be varied to maintain the proper boiler feedwater flow and pressure). An auxiliary boiler provides steam for the feed pump with its own turbine in order to provide flow through the boiler at startup without drawing power off the grid. One of the earlier supercritical plants in the country, the boiler design incorporates an improvement over the first full-scale supercritical units at Eddystone Electric Generating Station, near Philadelphia.  This improvement is a re-circulation circuit that increases water flow through the water walls surrounding the lower furnace in order to protect them during startup with considerably less flow through the entire boiler, thus saving fuel wasted as boiler flow is bypassed to the condenser during startup.

Since the plant's initial commissioning, several environmental control systems have either been upgraded or installed. These include modifications to the electrostatic precipitators, the addition of an ammonia flue gas conditioning system to improve precipitator performance, and a low/ burner system to reduce the oxides of nitrogen emissions. A Selective Catalytic Reactor (SCR) further reduces the  emissions. In 2009 a wet flue-gas desulfurization system was put in place to reduce sulfur dioxide and heavy metal emissions.  The plant has a continuous emissions monitoring system in the stack which must adhere to very rigid accuracy and reliability requirements established by the Commonwealth of Pennsylvania.

A consortium of mid-atlantic power companies owns the plant. PSEG Fossil owns a 22.84 percent share (391 net MW with peaker), while Reliant Resources, operates it. The plant is basically a twin of the Conemaugh Generating Station, also partially owned by PSEG Fossil.

Key Facts:  
Location: Shelocta, PA 
MW: 1,711 
Fuel: Coal 
Commercial Operation: Unit 1: 1967, Unit 2: 1968 
Ownership: 22.84% PSEG Fossil

Owners
(partial list of 78.26%)
Public Service Enterprise Group: 22.84% or 391 Megawatts
ArcLight Capital Partners: 20.91% or 358 Megawatts
Reliant Energy (operator): 16% or 274 Megawatts
PPL Montour LLC: 12.34% or 211 Megawatts
NRG Energy: 3.7% or 63 Megawatts
Duquesne Light Holdings: 2.47% or 42.3 Megawatts (this part was previously owned by Atlantic City Electric)

Emissions
Keystone was outfitted with a wet limestone scrubber system in late 2009 to partially remove heavy metals and sulfur dioxide from the emitted flue gas.

While the plant has had SCR technology in place since 2003 to reduce emissions of nitrogen oxides, after 2010 operation of this equipment during the ozone season (May – September) was severely curtailed.

Following the implementation of Pennsylvania’s Reasonably Available Control Technology rule (RACT 2) in 2017 which imposed more stringent emission requirements,  emission rates fell that year by 79% from 2011, the year of peak SCR curtailment.

See also

List of power stations in Pennsylvania

References

Based on a visit to the plant in approx. February 1967 by John M. Baxter

External links
PSEG Fossil
National ranking
Article on mercury emissions
Article
Another article

Energy infrastructure completed in 1967
Energy infrastructure completed in 1968
Towers completed in 1967
Chimneys in the United States
Coal-fired power stations in Pennsylvania
Buildings and structures in Armstrong County, Pennsylvania
Public Service Enterprise Group